3-Carene is a bicyclic monoterpene consisting of fused cyclohexene and cyclopropane rings. It occurs as a constituent of turpentine, with a content as high as 42% depending on the source. Carene has a sweet and pungent odor, best described as a combination of fir needles, musky earth, and damp woodlands.

A colorless liquid, it is not soluble in water, but miscible with fats and oils.  It is chiral, occurring naturally both as the racemate and enantio-enriched forms.

Reactions and uses
Treatment with peracetic acid gives 3,4-caranediol. Pyrolysis over ferric oxide induces rearrangement, giving p-cymene.  Carene is used in the perfume industry and as a chemical intermediate.

Because carene can be found in cannabis naturally, it can also be found in cannabis distillates. Greater concentrations of carene in a distillate give it an earthier taste and smell. 3-Carene is also present in mango, giving the fruit a characteristic pine-like flavor and aroma.

References

Flavors
Cyclohexenes
Monoterpenes
Bicyclic compounds
Cyclopropanes
Sweet-smelling chemicals